The City of Hope Mile Stakes is a Grade II American Thoroughbred horse race for horses aged three years old or older over the distance of one mile on the turf scheduled annually in September at Santa Anita Park in Arcadia, California.  The event currently carries a purse of $200,000.

History
The event was inaugurated on 4 October 1986 as the Colonel F. W. Koester Handicap at the Oak Tree Racing Association meeting at Santa Anita Park as the eighth race on the racecard and was won by the US Hall of Fame, Charles E. Whittingham trained Palace Music who broke the track record for the distance that was set by Pettrax in 20 April 1986. Palace Music in his next start would just fail winning the Breeders' Cup Mile finishing a head second to Last Tycoon. Colonel F. W. Koester was part of 1932 US Equestrian team, later was the General Manager of the California Thoroughbred Breeders Association from 1955 to 1969 and was elected into the California Racing Hall of Fame in 1988.

In 1989 the event was classified by the American Graded Stakes Committee as Grade III and was upgraded to Grade II status the following year.  

In 1996 the event was renamed to the Oak Tree Mile Handicap and at the same time was downgraded to Grade III. Between 1996 and 2006 the event had Breeders' Cup incentives which reflected in the name of the event. In 2003 the event was upgraded back to Grade II.

In 2013 the name of the event was changed to the City of Hope Stakes in honor of the cancer treatment center in Los Angeles. 

In 2017 the event was run as a Black Type event with a much lower purse as the Obviously Mile Stakes. The Irish bred Obviously won this event in 2012 when it was run as the Arroyo Seco Stakes and was fourth in 2013 and was third in 2016.

Records
Time record: 
 1:31.84 –  No Jet Lag  (2013)

Margins: 
 4 lengths - Double Feint (1987), Urgent Request  (IRE) (1996)

Most wins:
 2 – Mo Forza (2020, 2021)

Most wins by an owner:
 2 – Bardy Farm & OG Boss (2020, 2021)

Most wins by a jockey:
 4 – Gary Stevens (1986, 1988, 2000, 2018)

Most wins by a trainer:
 6 – Neil D. Drysdale (1989, 1998, 2000, 2004, 2006, 2010)

Winners

Legend:

See also
 List of American and Canadian Graded races

External site
 City of Hope Cancer Research Hospital & Cancer Treatment

References

Horse races in California
Santa Anita Park
Graded stakes races in the United States
Grade 2 stakes races in the United States
Open mile category horse races
Turf races in the United States
Recurring sporting events established in 1986
1986 establishments in California